The Santa Barbara City Fire Department (SBFD) is the agency that provides fire protection and basic life support (BLS)  emergency medical services exclusively for the city of Santa Barbara. Not to be confused Santa Barbara County Fire Department.

Equipment

Type 1 Engine
Santa Barbara City has a total of 11 Pumper Engines with 7 acting as frontline engines and an additional 4 in reserve. These engines are staffed by 3 personnel, A captain, an engineer and a firefighter. Each engine is fitted with a 1500 GPM pump and carries 750 gallons of water.

Type 3 Engine
The Type 3 Engines, which are used mainly for vegetation fires, are smaller than the Type 1s which are used primarily in the city.  The Type 3 has 4 x 4 capability and can thus climb hills and make it through rough terrain. One of the features that makes the Type 3 ideal for vegetation fires is that it can pump water while driving, whereas the Type 1 engine must be put into park to flow water. This allows the Type 3 to make "mobile attacks" on vegetation fires, a tactic that can help minimize the rate of spread by having a firefighter walk the edge of a fire with a hose line and the Type 3 trailing close behind. Each of the engines feature a 500-gallon water tank and a 20-gallon tank for the Class A foam injection. In September 2013, the SBFD bought a second $400,000 Type 3 Engine and placed it at station 7, moving the older Type 3 to station 4.

Special Response Unit
The Special Response Unit is a box van that contains supplies for a Mass Casualty Incident (MCI). It is dispatched automatically to any reported aircraft emergency on or off the airport as well as by request of any incident's IC.

Heavy Rescue
In March 2006, the SBFD acquired a $450,000 Heavy Rescue unit built by SVI Trucks. At over 33 feet long, the Heavy Rescue weighs 44,000 pounds, fully loaded. The interior has seating for six people as well as storage for all the tools necessary. The vehicle also has foldout awnings on both sides.

Airport Foam Engines
Station 8, located at the Santa Barbara Municipal Airport, which was previously under the jurisdiction of Santa Barbara County Fire and was later annex to the City of Santa Barbara, is home to 3 Oshkosh Striker vehicles. Responding to approximately 65 calls per year, each of these engines can carry 1500 gallons of foam, dry chemical and Halotron.

Stations and apparatus

See also
Santa Barbara County Fire Department

References

Santa Barbara, California
Fire departments in California